On November 15, 2022, the 45th president of the United States,  Donald Trump, announced his campaign for a non-consecutive second presidential term in a speech at Mar-a-Lago in Palm Beach, Florida. 

Trump reportedly had been considering a 2024 presidential run immediately after his loss in the 2020 U.S. presidential election to Democratic Party challenger Joe Biden. In the week of November 9, 2020, Trump indicated to Republican Party senator Kevin Cramer: "If this doesn't work out, I'll just run again in four years." In December 2021, CNN reported that "Trump's wait-and-see approach to the 2024 election has frozen the next Republican presidential primary", with potential challengers keeping their heads down while awaiting Trump's official decision on the matter.

After months of speculation, Trump announced his candidacy for president in a November 15, 2022 speech to supporters at his Mar-a-Lago estate in Florida. His announcement received wide media coverage and a mixed response from both Democrats and Republicans. Some Democrats warily welcomed the campaign, viewing Trump as beatable, while others opposed it, citing negative effects it could have on U.S. democracy. Some Republicans, consisting mostly of Trump loyalists, welcomed the campaign, while others (including most Republican elected officials) opposed it, viewing Trump as a weak and beatable candidate who had lost the Republicans the past several election cycles. 

If Trump's run succeeds, he would break Biden's record as the oldest candidate ever to be elected to the presidency; if he runs against Biden again, it will be the first presidential rematch since 1956 when Dwight D. Eisenhower successfully ran for reelection against Adlai Stevenson II, and if Trump wins, he will be the second person to lose a presidential election and then win a rematch of that election after Grover Cleveland did so in 1892, as well as the second president (after Cleveland) to serve two nonconsecutive terms.

Background

Previous activities and controversies

Trump won the 2016 general election with an electoral vote of 304 to Democratic nominee Hillary Clinton's 227. Trump lost the popular vote, receiving nearly 3 million fewer votes than Clinton, the greatest negative margin of any winning presidential candidate in history; he was thereby elected the 45th president of the United States on November 8, 2016, and inaugurated on January 20, 2017. He unsuccessfully sought reelection in the 2020 United States presidential election, losing to Democratic nominee Joe Biden, who obtained an electoral vote of 306 to Trump's 232. Trump also lost the popular vote by 7 million votes. With one week remaining in his presidency, Trump was impeached by the House of Representatives for incitement of insurrection for his actions during the January 6 Capitol Hill attack a week earlier, but was ultimately acquitted in the Democratic-controlled Senate because the 57–43 vote in favor of conviction fell short of the 2/3 supermajority (67 out of 100 senators) required. Trump is the only US president to have been impeached twice. Trump continues to falsely claim that the election was stolen, which has led to ongoing controversy within the Republican party.

Trump is generally regarded by presidential historians and scholars as one of the worst presidents in U.S. history. One representative survey of presidential experts rated Trump last in overall ability, background, integrity, intelligence, and executive appointments, and next to last in party leadership, relationship to congress, and ability to compromise. Among the American public, Trump's average 41 percent approval rating was the lowest of any president since Gallup began polling, and he left office with a 34 percent approval rating and 62 percent disapproval rating in his final polls.

, Trump is facing numerous lawsuits and criminal investigations into his activities. The four major criminal investigations currently involving Trump concern: 1) his alleged improper removal of a large number of classified documents to his home in Mar-a-Lago following his presidency; 2) his alleged actions during the January 6 Capitol Hill attack; 3) his alleged attempts to intimidate Georgia election officials and obstruct the results of the presidential election in Georgia in 2020; 4) and his alleged financial fraud in misrepresenting his assets when attempting to secure loans and valuation for his businesses.  The chairman of Trump's 2016 presidential campaign, Paul Manafort, his former chief political strategist, Steve Bannon, and former campaign counsel, Michael Cohen, have all been convicted of various crimes and sentenced to prison since 2018. At least 8 other members of Trump's prior campaigns have been charged with crimes since 2017.

Discussions of potential candidacy
In the days before the end of his term in January 2021, Trump began discussing the possibility of forming a third party, to be called the "Patriot Party", to contest the election against both Democratic and Republican candidates. Spokespersons for Trump later denied that he had such plans.

In March 2021, Trump's niece, psychologist Mary L. Trump, asserted that Trump will not run a genuine campaign for the presidency again, but will "pretend" to run for president in order to profit off of the publicity generated by such an effort. In April 2021, however, CNN reported that Trump was "yearning to return to the White House" and that Trump's support of candidates for other races at that time was "principally aimed at supporting that goal".

In July 2022, as the public hearings of the House Select Committee on the January 6 Attack were progressing, Trump was reportedly considering making an early announcement of his 2024 candidacy. On July 14, 2022, Intelligencer published an interview with Trump, based upon which they reported that Trump had already made up his mind, and was just deciding when to declare. Following the August 2022 FBI search of Mar-a-Lago, many of Trump's allies urged that he announce his candidacy sooner, including some who had previously advised that he defer an announcement until after the mid-term elections. During a rally in Iowa in the run-up to the 2022 United States midterm elections, Trump stated, "in order to make our country successful and safe and glorious, I will very, very, very probably do it again", indicating that he might announce his candidacy soon thereafter, prompting speculation that he would announce as soon as the week of November 14, 2022.

Eligibility
The question of Trump's eligibility to run for president in 2024 is delineated by the US Constitution.  Two amendments addressing this issue are the 14th and 22nd Amendments.

Eligibility under the 22nd Amendment
Trump has only been elected president once, in 2016, so is not limited from running again by the 22nd Amendment, which permits two full terms.  Even before losing the 2020 election, he publicly proclaimed his willingness to seek a third term in 2024, despite this being explicitly prohibited. Trump claimed that Barack Obama had spied on him and his campaign, and that this meant he was "'entitled' [to a third term] because he was spied on."

Trump is seeking to become the second president to serve non-consecutive terms, after Grover Cleveland who was re-elected in 1892. The last one-term president to campaign for a second non-consecutive term was Herbert Hoover, who after serving from 1929 to 1933 made unsuccessful runs in 1936 and 1940.

Eligibility under the 14th Amendment
In the aftermath of the American Civil War, the 14th Amendment was passed. Section 3 of the amendment prohibits anyone from holding public office if they had previously sworn an oath to support the Constitution, but then "engaged in insurrection or rebellion against the [United States], or given aid or comfort to the enemies thereof."  The full text of this section reads:

Trump's role in the January 6 United States Capitol attack is cited by opponents as a reason for his disqualification from seeking public office. On January 10, 2021, Nancy Pelosi, the Speaker of the House, formally requested Representatives' input as to whether Section 3 pertained to the outgoing President. On January 13, 2021, the House of Representatives impeached Trump for 'incitement of insurrection' by a vote of 232-to-197. On February 13, 2021, the Senate voted on the charge, with 57 senators casting votes of 'Guilty' to 43 as 'Not Guilty'; removal by impeachment requires a two-thirds supermajority of the United States Senate to convict in an impeachment trial.

Some legal experts believe a court would be required to make a final determination if Trump was disqualified under Section 3. In September 2022, a New Mexico District Court Judge removed local official Couy Griffin from office due to his participation in the January 6 attack, which some commentators felt established a precedent to bar Trump from office. A state may also make a determination that Trump is disqualified under Section 3 from appearing on that state's ballot.  Trump could appeal in court any disqualification by Congress or by a state.  In addition to state or federal legislative action, a court action could be brought against Trump seeking his disqualification under Section 3. The 14th Amendment itself provides a path for Trump to assert eligibility in such a case:
"But Congress may, by a vote of two-thirds of each House, remove such disability."

Announcement
On November 15, 2022, Trump announced his candidacy at Mar-a-Lago in an hour-long speech. The announcement came one week after the election in which Trump-endorsed House candidates underperformed non-Trump-endorsed candidates by seven percentage points. His announcement speech was "full of exaggerated and false talking points" and at least "20 false and misleading claims", uttering the first inaccurate claim "about two minutes in and a few minutes later, tick(ing) off at least four hyperbolic claims about his own accomplishments". The New York Times Fact Check stated that "Mr. Trump repeated many familiar exaggerations about his own achievements, reiterated misleading attacks on political opponents and made dire assessments that were at odds with reality."

The New York Post mocked Trump's announcement by relegating it to page 26 and noting it on the cover with a banner reading "Florida Man Makes Announcement". The article referred to Mar-a-Lago as "Trump's classified-documents library" in reference to the ongoing investigation regarding Trump's alleged improper handling of classified materials which he had brought to Mar-a-Lago following his presidency for as yet unclear reasons.

Attendees
The announcement was attended by comedian Alex Stein; consultant Roger Stone; businessman Mike Lindell; Representative Madison Cawthorn (R-NC); former deputy director of the Office of Management and Budget Russell Vought; political advisor Jason Miller; attorney Kash Patel; political analyst Sebastian Gorka; and political aide Hogan Gidley. The Insider noted "many members of congress were not in attendance", including Matt Gaetz. Family members who attended included Trump's wife and former first lady Melania, Trump's sons Barron and Eric, Eric's wife Lara, and Trump's son-in-law Jared Kushner. His daughters Ivanka and Tiffany did not attend the announcement party; Ivanka said she would not be engaging in politics going forward and would not be a part of her father's presidential bid. Trump's son Donald Trump Jr. also did not attend.  Ivanka had been a senior advisor in her father's administration, and also was the director of the Office of Economic Initiatives and Entrepreneurship. Trump invited Admiral Charles Kubic VFAF national spokesman, Donna and Stan Fitzgerald, Veterans For Trump chief political advisor, with Angie Wong VFAF national media rep from the organization. The Fitzgeralds and Wong attended, Kubic was out of the country. The VFAF organization will be part of the Trump collation's team for the campaign.

Post-announcement developments
Three days after Trump announced his candidacy, U.S. Attorney General Merrick Garland appointed Jack Smith to serve as special counsel for the investigations regarding Trump's role in the January 6 attack and into mishandling of government records. Special counsels can be appointed when there can be a conflict of interest or the appearance of it, and Garland said the announced political candidacies of both Trump and President Biden prompted him to take what he described as an "extraordinary step". Special counsel investigations operate largely independent of Justice Department control under decades-old federal regulations, and Garland said the "appointment underscores the department's commitment to both independence and accountability in particularly sensitive matters".

In late November 2022, Kanye West announced his own candidacy for the 2024 presidential election. Shortly thereafter, West visited Trump at Mar-a-Lago, bringing with him Nick Fuentes, a white nationalist and Holocaust denier. West claimed that after he asked Trump to be his vice-presidential candidate, "Trump started basically screaming at me at the table telling me I was going to lose". Trump responded with a statement that West "unexpectedly showed up with three of his friends, whom I knew nothing about", and in a further statement acknowledged advising West to drop out of the race. Several other possible 2024 contenders spoke in the aftermath of this event, with Arkansas governor Asa Hutchinson calling the meeting "very troubling", and Trump's former vice president Mike Pence calling on Trump to apologize for giving Fuentes "a seat at the table". Mitch McConnell said that Trump was unlikely to win the 2024 presidential election as a result of the dinner.

On December 3, 2022, following the publication of "The Twitter Files" by Elon Musk, Trump complained of election fraud and posted to Truth Social, calling for "the termination of all rules, regulations, and articles, even those found in the Constitution."

The Trump Organization was convicted of 17 counts of criminal fraud in December 2022, and polls indicated that a majority of Americans believed Trump should be charged with additional crimes.

On January 28, 2023, he held his first campaign events in South Carolina and New Hampshire.

On March 4, 2023, Trump delivered a lengthy keynote speech at the CPAC convention, also attended by Nikki Haley, but not by other prospective Republican candidates. In his speech, Trump promised to serve as the retribution for those who were wronged, and stated that he was the only candidate who could prevent World War III.

Vice-presidential choice

Mike Pence served as Trump's vice president from 2017 to 2021, with Pence having been Trump's chosen running mate in both the 2016 and 2020 elections.  In March 2021, Bloomberg News reported that if Trump runs again in 2024, Pence "likely won't be on the ticket" and that Trump has "discussed alternatives to Pence", while Trump's advisors "have discussed identifying a Black or female running mate for his next run". Trump announced in March 2022 that if he runs for re-election and wins the GOP nomination, Pence would not be his running mate. If that does happen, he will be the first president since Gerald Ford to pick someone other than his first vice president as his running mate. In June 2022, a former aide testified that Trump had opined to his staff during the Capitol Hill attack that Pence "deserved" the chants of "hang Mike Pence" made by the mob. Names raised as possible candidates for the position include South Dakota governor Kristi Noem and South Carolina senator Tim Scott. In April 2021, Trump indicated that he was considering Florida governor Ron DeSantis for the position, noting his friendship with DeSantis and the swing state status of Florida. Trump has since begun heavily criticizing DeSantis.

Endorsements 

A number of Republican officials at both federal and state levels were quick to endorse Trump's candidacy, while others were noted for being silent on the question, with a few stating opposition.

Veterans for Trump (aka Veterans For America First), a national veterans group, has endorsed Donald Trump for his 2024 presidential run.  Trump shared the Veterans group endorsement on his Truth Social page.

Support
Politico noted in December 2020 that many Republican figures were expressing support for a Trump 2024 run, quoting Missouri Senator Josh Hawley as saying "If he were to run in 2024, I think he would be the nominee. And I would support him doing that." National public opinion polling showed Trump quickly dominating the field of potential 2024 Republican candidates. Utah Senator Mitt Romney, though opposed to Trump, stated in February 2021 that if Trump ran in 2024, he would win the Republican nomination in a landslide. The same month, Republican Senate Minority Leader Mitch McConnell said that he would "absolutely" support Trump if the latter was nominated again.

Russian state TV host Olga Skabeyeva said
Russia, which allegedly interfered in the 2016 and 2020 presidential elections to aid Trump, "will have to think whether to reinstall him again as the American president. " In April 2022, American intelligence officials assessed that Russia intended to exact revenge on the Biden administration for its sanctions against Russia and aid for Ukraine by intervening in the election on Trump's behalf. A Russian state TV host, Evgeny Popov, said in March 2020, "to again help our partner Trump to become president".

Opposition 
The donor network of Charles Koch announced it would fund a primary challenge to Trump.

Nikki Haley announced on February 14, 2023 her 2024 presidential campaign and the first challenger to Trump in the 2024 Republican Party presidential primaries. One of her first statements as a candidate was to call for candidates over the age of 75—which would include both Trump and Biden—to be required to take a competency test.

Polling

General election polling

Joe Biden vs. Donald Trump 

Joe Biden vs. Donald Trump
 Aggregate polls

Joe Biden vs. Donald Trump vs. Andrew Yang

Primary election polling

Nationwide polling

Statewide polling

Florida primary

Georgia primary

Iowa caucuses

Maine primary

In Maine's 2nd congressional district

Missouri primary

New Hampshire primary

North Carolina primary

Statewide polling

Florida primary

Georgia primary

Maine primary

In Maine's 2nd congressional district

Missouri primary

New Hampshire primary

North Carolina primary

See also

 Trump fake electors plot

Notes

References

External links
 Campaign website

 
2022 establishments in the United States
2024 Republican Party (United States) presidential campaigns
Presidential campaign, 2024